The Colégio Luso-Internacional do Porto (abbreviated as CLIP; Portuguese for Luso-International School of Porto), officially known in English as the Oporto International School, is a private international school in Porto, Portugal.

History
CLIP was founded in 1988 as an initiative of the Luso-International Foundation for Education and Culture. CLIP inaugurated its first class in 1990 (school year 1990-91) with a class of 44 students.

CLIP is a fully accredited school by the Council of International Schools (CIS), since 2013.

Student body
Today CLIP has approximately 1000 students, aged 3 to 18, from more than 40 countries, representing 35% of the student body.

OPOMUN
CLIP annually hosts the Oporto Model United Nations (OPOMUN) since 2007.

References

External links
Official Website

International Baccalaureate schools in Portugal
International schools in Porto
Educational institutions established in 1988
1988 establishments in Portugal
Education in Porto
Private schools in Portugal